The Naisten Suomi-sarja, distinguished as the Jääkiekon naisten Suomi-sarja, is the third-tier women's ice hockey league in Finland. It was founded by the Finnish Ice Hockey Association in 2003.

Season format

2022–23 season 
Excepting the ten teams of the Naisten Liiga, all women's ice hockey teams competing at the national level began the season in the Naisten Mestis qualifiers. The Naisten Mestis qualifiers, which were contested during September to December 2022, involved eighteen teams divided into three groups of five to seven teams. In the closed groups, each team played every other team at least twice. The top eight teams at the end of the qualifiers continued in the Naisten Mestis and the remaining teams filled the ranks of the Naisten Suomi-sarja.

2023–24 season 
Beginning in the 2023–24 season, the Naisten Mestis will adopt the ten team, 36-game format used by the Naisten Liiga. From that time, all teams not playing in the Naisten Liiga or Naisten Mestis and any new teams will play in the Naisten Suomi-sarja. The top teams in the Naisten Suomi-sarja will have the opportunity to earn promotion to the Naisten Mestis in a promotion/relegation series against the bottom ranked Naisten Mestis teams at the end of the season.

Previous formats 
2016–2022 seasons

With the exception of the eight Naisten SM-sarja teams, all women's teams teams started the season in the Naisten Mestis qualifiers. The top eight teams qualified for the Naisten Mestis regular season and the remaining teams continued the season in the Naisten Suomi-sarja. 

The best four teams of the Naisten Suomi-sarja regular season earned placement in the finals of the Naisten Mestis. The other teams continued the season in the final series of the Naisten Suomi-sarja. The series winner was determined in the final tournament.

Teams

2022–23 season
Lohko 1
 HIFK U18, Helsinki
 Ilves Akatemia, Tampere
 Panelian Raikas (PaRa), Eura
 Pelicans, Lahti
 Salo HT, Salo
 TPS Akatemia, Turku
 Turku HC, Turku
Source: 

Lohko 2
 Jyvässeudun Kiekko (JyKi), Jyväskylä
 Kiilat, Haapajärvi
 LL-89 Red Lights, Lapinlahti
 Muhoksen Jääklubi (MuJK), Muhos
 S-Kiekko, Seinäjoki
Source:

Teams in previous seasons 
Each team that participated in the Naisten Suomi-sarja, listed by rank within their Luhko at the end of the regular season.

2021–22 season

Lohko 1
 LL-89 Red Lights, Lapinlahti
 Kiilat, Haapajärvi
 Kajastus, Kontiolahti
 TeKi, Raahe
 JyKi, Jyväskylä
 KalPa Akatemia, Kuopio
 S-Kiekko, Seinäjoki

Lohko 2
 SaiPa, Lappeenranta
 Pelicans, Lahti
 HIFK Akatemia, Helsinki
 Kiekko-Espoo Akatemia, Espoo

Lohko 3
 TPS Akatemia, Turku
 PaRa, Panelia
 Turku HC, Turku

2020–21 season
Lohko 1
 KJT Haukat, Kerava
 Pelicans, Lahti
 Rockets, Loimaa
 UJK, Uusikaupunki

Lohko 2
 LL-89, Lapinlahti
 KalPa Akatemia, Kuopio
 TeKi-Hermes, Raahe/Kokkola
 SaiPa, Lappeenranta (did not play)

2019–20 season

Lohko 1
 Kiekko-Espoo Akatemia, Espoo
 Uudenkaupungin Jää-Kotkat (UJK), Uusikaupunki
 Rockets, Loima
 PaRa, Panelia
 Salo HT, Salo

Lohko 2
 Hermes, Kokkola
 LL-89, Lapinlahti
 KalPa Akatemia, Kuopio
 Teräs-Kiekko (TeKi), Raahe
 Jukurit, Mikkeli

2018–19 season
Lohko 1
 Espoon Kiekkoseura (EKS), Espoo
 UJK, Uusikaupunki
 Salo HT, Salo
 Rockets, Loimaa
 PaRa, Panelia

Lohko 2
 Ylivieskan Jääkarhut (YJK), Ylivieska
 Ruoveden Seurakunnan Atleetit (RuoSkA), Ruovesi
 Ähtärin Kiekko-Haukat (KieHa), Ähtäri
 Junkkarit Hockey Team (JHT), Kalajoki

Lohko 3
 SaiPa
 KalPa Akatemia
 LL-89 Red Lights, 
 Jukurit, Mikkeli
 Joensuun Kiekko-Pojat (Jokipojat), Joensuu

References 

Ice hockey leagues in Finland
Women's ice hockey in Finland
Finland
Ice hockey